Inter-County Mortgage and Finance Company is a historical building located in Camden, Camden County, New Jersey, United States. The building was finished in 1929 and was added to the National Register of Historic Places on August 22, 1990.

See also
National Register of Historic Places listings in Camden County, New Jersey

References

Commercial buildings on the National Register of Historic Places in New Jersey
Office buildings completed in 1929
Buildings and structures in Camden, New Jersey
National Register of Historic Places in Camden County, New Jersey
New Jersey Register of Historic Places